Came House is a privately owned country house next to the village of Winterborne Came, in Dorset, England. Built in the mid-18th century, it is a Grade I listed building.

Description

History
The house was built for John Damer by Francis Cartwright of Blandford in 1754; after Cartwright's death in 1758 the interior was completed by Vile and Cobb, cabinet makers of London, in 1762. There is a kitchen wing on the east, connected to the house by a passageway.

In the mid-19th century an entrance with porch, vestibule and cloakrooms, and a cast-iron domed conservatory, were added on the west side of the house. The conservatory is attributed to the architect Charles Fowler. A library was also established at that time and other minor changes were made. There have otherwise been few alterations.

Present day
 the house is a venue for weddings and parties.

References

Grade I listed buildings in Dorset
Country houses in Dorset